Keflavík (pronounced , meaning Driftwood Bay) is a town in the Reykjanes region in southwest Iceland. It is included in the municipality of Reykjanesbær whose population as of 2016 is 15,129.

In 1995, Keflavik merged with nearby Njarðvík and Hafnir to form the municipality of Reykjanesbær.

History 
Founded in the 16th century, Keflavík developed on account of its fishing and fish processing industry, founded by Scottish entrepreneurs and engineers. Later its growth continued from flight operations at the Keflavík International Airport which was built by the United States military during the 1940s. The airport used to hold a significant NATO military base and was a vital pre-jet refueling stop for trans-Atlantic commercial air traffic. It now serves as Iceland's main international hub.

During World War II the military airfield served as a refueling and transit depot. During the Cold War, Naval Air Station Keflavik played an important role in monitoring marine and submarine traffic from the Norwegian and Greenland seas into the Atlantic Ocean. Forces from the United States Air Force were added to provide radar monitoring, fighter intercept, in-flight refueling, and aerial/marine rescue. After the collapse of the Soviet Union, however, the base's role was cast into doubt. The base officially closed on 30 September 2006, when the United States withdrew the remaining 30 military personnel.

In Iceland, Keflavík was renowned as a rich source of musicians during the 1960s and 70s, and is therefore also known as bítlabærinn  or "The Beatle Town".

Geography 
The local geography is dominated by fields of basalt rubble, interspersed with a few hardy plants and mosses. On a clear day, one can see Snæfellsjökull across the bay, some 115 km away.

Climate 
The climate of Keflavík is subarctic (Dfc) with cool summers and moderately cold winters. There is no truly dry month but June is the month that gets the least amount of precipitation. Winter high temperatures average above the freezing mark, and summer high temperatures are cool to mild.

Sport
The town is represented in sports by Íþrótta- og ungmennafélag Keflavíkur.

In popular culture
The former NATO military base Naval Air Station Keflavik is used as a setting for an important story line in Tom Clancy's novel Red Storm Rising. Clancy speculated about the base, the geography, local flora, and the station equipment.

NAS Keflavík is also a central setting in Icelandic writer Arnaldur Indriðason's 1999 mystery Napóleonsskjölin, translated into English in 2011 as Operation Napoleon.

See also 
 Cold War
 Iceland Defense Force, headquartered in Keflavík until 2006
 Uppspretta

References

External links

 Satellite picture by Google Maps

 
Populated places in Southern Peninsula (Iceland)
Reykjanes
Populated places established in the 16th century
Defence of Iceland
Populated coastal places in Iceland